Shortcomings is a 2023 American comedy film directed and produced by Randall Park, from a screenplay by Adrian Tomine, based upon his comic of the same name. It stars  Justin H. Min, Sherry Cola, Ally Maki, Debby Ryan, Tavi Gevinson, Sonoya Mizuno, Jacob Batalon and Timothy Simons.

It had its world premiere at the 2023 Sundance Film Festival on January 21, 2023.

Cast
 Justin H. Min as Ben
 Sherry Cola as Alice, Ben's bestfriend 
 Ally Maki as Miko, Ben's girlfriend
 Debby Ryan as Sasha
 Tavi Gevinson as Autumn
 Sonoya Mizuno as Meredith
 Jacob Batalon as Gene
 Timothy Simons as Leon
Additionally, Ronny Chieng and Stephanie Hsu have cameos in the film.

Production
In March 2021, it was announced Randall Park would direct the film from a screenplay by Adrian Tomine, based upon his comic of the same name, with Roadside Attractions set to produce. In August 2022, Justin H. Min, Sherry Cola, Ally Maki, Debby Ryan, Tavi Gevinson, Sonoya Mizuno, Jacob Batalon and Timothy Simons joined the cast of the film, with principal photography concluding in New York City.

Release
It had its world premiere at the 2023 Sundance Film Festival on January 21, 2023. In March 2023, Sony Pictures Classics acquired distribution rights to the film.

References

External links
 
 

2023 films
2023 directorial debut films
Roadside Attractions films
2023 independent films
Sony Pictures Classics films
2020s comedy films
2020s English-language films
2023 comedy films
Films based on comics
Films shot in New York (state)